The A823(M) is a motorway in Fife, Scotland.  It is a 1-mile (1.6 km) spur from the M90 into Dunfermline. The road provides a fast route for traffic from Dunfermline to the Forth Road Bridge. When it opened in 1964 it was intended to be part of a longer motorway continuing eastbound along to the north coast of the Firth of Forth and a bridge was built for this extension.  Following the upgrade of the A92 it is unlikely this route will be constructed.

Junctions

See also 
List of motorways in the United Kingdom

References

External links

CBRD Motorway Database – A823(M)
Pathetic Motorways – A823(M)

Motorways in Scotland
Transport in Fife